Ughtred James Kay-Shuttleworth, 1st Baron Shuttleworth,  (18 December 1844 – 20 December 1939), known as Sir Ughtred Kay-Shuttleworth, Bt, between 1872 and 1902, was a British landowner and Liberal politician. He was Under-Secretary of State for India and Chancellor of the Duchy of Lancaster under William Ewart Gladstone in 1886 and Parliamentary and Financial Secretary to the Admiralty under Gladstone and Lord Rosebery between 1892 and 1895.

Background
Shuttleworth was the son of the physician, civil servant and social reformer James Kay-Shuttleworth. His father, born James Kay, had assumed the additional surname of Shuttleworth on his marriage to Janet Shuttleworth, the only child and heiress of Robert Shuttleworth, of Gawthorpe Hall in Padiham, Lancashire. His father's brothers included the economist Joseph Kay and the Lord Justice of Appeal Sir Edward Kay.

The Shuttleworth family had been landowners in Lancashire from medieval times. Tradition states they made their fortune from wool weaving. They supported the parliamentary side in the English Civil War. Sir James and Lady Shuttleworth parted company after five children and Shuttleworth was raised largely apart from his father. For some years in his youth he lived in Germany with his mother. On her death, in 1872, he inherited large estates, including Gawthorpe Hall. His father then relocated to another of the estates, in Westmorland.

Political career
Shuttleworth was returned to parliament for Hastings in 1869, a seat he held until 1880. He remained out of parliament until 1885, when he was elected for the Clitheroe division of Lancashire, a constituency he continued to represent until his elevation to the peerage in 1902. When the Liberals came to power under William Ewart Gladstone in February 1886, Shuttleworth was made Under-Secretary of State for India. Already in April he became Chancellor of the Duchy of Lancaster, replacing Edward Heneage, who had resigned over Irish Home Rule. He was sworn of the Privy Council at the same time. He remained Chancellor of the Duchy of Lancaster until the Liberals fell from power in July 1886.

Shuttleworth returned to office under Gladstone in 1892 when he was made Parliamentary and Financial Secretary to the Admiralty, a post he held until 1895, the last year under the premiership of Lord Rosebery. In the 1902 Coronation Honours, he was raised to the peerage as Baron Shuttleworth, of Gawthorpe, in the County Palatine of Lancaster. From 1908 to 1928 he was Lord Lieutenant of Lancashire, in which capacity in 1910 he entertained King George V and Queen Mary at Gawthorpe Hall.

Family
Lord Shuttleworth married Blanche Marion, daughter of Sir Woodbine Parish, in 1871. They had two sons and four daughters (Angela, Nina, Rachel, Lawrence, Edward and Catherine). Both his sons, Captain the Hon. Lawrence Ughtred Kay-Shuttleworth (1887–1917) and T/Captain the Hon. Edward James Kay-Shuttleworth (1890–1917) were killed in the First World War. Lady Shuttleworth died in June 1924. Lord Shuttleworth survived her by fifteen years and died in December 1939, aged 95.

He was succeeded in his titles by his grandson, Richard Kay-Shuttleworth, 2nd Baron Shuttleworth[Richard]]], eldest son of the Hon. Lawrence Kay-Shuttleworth. The second baron was killed during the Battle of Britain only eight months later, when his Hawker Hurricane went missing during a battle over a Channel convoy, south of the Isle of Wight.

Richard's younger brother, Ronald, the third Baron, was killed in North Africa in 1942. The barony passed to Ronald's first cousin, Charles, the fourth Baron Shuttleworth. He was badly injured in the Second World War, losing one leg and the use of the other. He moved to another home, Leck Hall at Leck, Lancashire, on his estates, which was more convenient to his disability, leaving his aunt Rachel to continue living at Gawthorpe Hall until her death in 1967. The estate became a National Trust property in 1970.

Works

References

External links

 

Shuttleworth, Ughtred Kay-Shuttleworth, 1st Baron
Shuttleworth, Ughtred Kay-Shuttleworth, 1st Baron
Shuttleworth, Ughtred Kay-Shuttleworth, 1st Baron
Deputy Lieutenants of Westmorland
Liberal Party (UK) MPs for English constituencies
Shuttleworth, Ughtred Kay-Shuttleworth, 1st Baron
UK MPs 1868–1874
UK MPs 1874–1880
UK MPs 1885–1886
UK MPs 1886–1892
UK MPs 1892–1895
UK MPs 1895–1900
UK MPs 1900–1906
UK MPs who were granted peerages
Members of the London School Board
Members of the Privy Council of the United Kingdom
Peers created by Edward VII
Chancellors of the Duchy of Lancaster